Romance from the Tatra Mountains (Czech: Tatranská romance) is a 1934 Czech romance drama film directed by Josef Rovenský. The film competed at 1935 Venice Film Festival. The film was also dubbed to German and released under the title Das Lied der Heimat in 1935.

Cast
Pavel Ludikar as Blacksmith Pavel
Arno Velecký as Janko, Pavel's son
Jiřina Štěpničková as Blacksmith's fosterdaughter Anuška
Markéta Krausová as Soňa Varenová
Antonín Soukup as Farmer Jura
Světla Svozilová as Zuzka

References

External links
 

1934 films
Czechoslovak black-and-white films
Czech romantic drama films
Films directed by Josef Rovenský
1934 drama films
1935 drama films
1935 films
1930s Czech films